Ada Turci (17 January 1924 – 3 February 2012)  was an Italian javelin thrower who competed at the 1952 Summer Olympics,

Biography
Ada Turci did not abandon the competitive sports and continued to compete in masters athletics. She won three more medals at the second edition of the European Veterans Athletics Championships, which were curiously held in Helsinki in 1980, in the city where 28 years before she had participated in the Olympic Games.

Achievements
Senior

Masters

National titles
She won 13 (10 consecutive years from 1946 to 1955) national championships at senior level.
Italian Athletics Championships
Javelin throw: 1943, (1945), 1946, 1947, 1948, 1949, 1950, 1951, 1952, 1953, 1954, 1955, 1958

References

External links
 

1924 births
2012 deaths
Athletes (track and field) at the 1952 Summer Olympics
Italian female javelin throwers
Olympic athletes of Italy
Sportspeople from the Province of Mantua
Italian masters athletes
Olympic female javelin throwers
People from Quistello